Ayala Hakim is an Israeli businesswoman and former military person. She is an executive of the technology division of Mizrahi-Tefahot Bank, Israel. Previously she was a member of the Israeli Defence Forces, discharged in the rank of Brigadier-general. 

In 1999 she was transferred to the Israeli Intelligence Corps and in 2002 she became head of the computing unit of the Military Intelligence Directorate.

In 2006 the became the  14th commander of Mamram (2006-2010).

In 2010 she was promoted to the rank of Colonel-general and appointed head of Lotem (2010-2013). The was the third woman to be promoted to this rank and the first woman in the IDF computer services.

In 2013 she was presented with the Lidwig Mitvah Award for Outstanding Information Systems Managers.

After the discharge from the IDF in July 2013 she joined Mizrahi-Tefahot as director of the information technology division. ,  she is CEO of the Technology Division and Chief Information Officer (CIO) of the bank. 

On September 30, 2020 Misrahi-Tefahot appointed her to the Board of Directors of the Union Bank of Israel after the acquisition of the Union Bank by Mizrahi-Tefahot.

She has B.S. in Economics and Political Science and M.S. in Business Management from Bar-Ilan University.  

Hakim is married and has a  daughter.

References

Year of birth missing (living people)
Living people
20th-century Israeli military personnel
21st-century Israeli businesswomen
21st-century Israeli businesspeople
21st-century Israeli military personnel
Bar-Ilan University alumni
Brigadier generals
Female generals of Israel
Israeli bankers
People of the Military Intelligence Directorate (Israel)